Nancy Karen Fleurival (born c. 1985) is a beauty pageant contestant who competed in Miss World 2007.

Fleurival won Miss Guadeloupe World 2007/2008. She was one of the finalists in the Miss Model International pageant held in Martinique and was a semi-finalist in the Miss Caribbean Queen 2008.  She represented Guadeloupe in Miss World 2007 in Sanya, China, and also in Miss International 2008 in Macau, China.

Fleurival is the eldest of four siblings from Abymes on the French Caribbean island of Guadeloupe.  She earned a degree in economic science and manages a mobile phone shop.

References

1980s births
Living people
Miss World 2007 delegates
Guadeloupean beauty pageant winners
Miss International 2008 delegates